Elias Goldberg (March 14, 1886 – February 22, 1978) was an American painter.

Biography
From 1906 to 1909 Elias Goldberg studied with George Bridgman at the Art Students League of New York. In 1915 his illustration work published in The Masses and in 1917 Elias Goldberg illustrated an English-language version of "Souvenirs Entomologiques" by the French entomologist Jean Henri Fabre.

In 1918 he was in the second annual exhibition of the Society of Independent Artists. During the 1920s he was an illustrator for the Japan Paper Company and for Hal Marchbanks Press. It was during this period that he studied and painted in Europe and developed friendships with Jules Pascin, Man Ray and Marcel Duchamp. In 1935 he had his first one-man show at Another Place Gallery.

In 1948 he had his first show at the Charles Egan Gallery and enjoyed friendships with Willem de Kooning and Elaine de Kooning and Jackson Pollock. In the 1950s, he befriended a younger generation of artists such as Knox Martin (a fellow artist in the Charles Egan Gallery), Reuben Nakian, Herman Rose, Peter Golfinopoulos and Joseph Stapleton. In the 1960s he had a series of critically acclaimed one-man shows at the Charles Egan Gallery. In 1973 he received a grant from the Mark Rothko Foundation.

Elias Goldberg died on February 22, 1978, in New York City.

Work
Goldberg is best known for cityscapes, still lifes, interiors, figures and landscapes. He created oil paintings, watercolors, drawings. Most of his city paintings focus on the area of Washington Heights in Upper Manhattan, where he lived from 1945 on.

Articles
Lawrence Campbell, "Elias Goldberg Paints a Picture", ARTnews, 1963
Rosalind Constable, "The Pissarro of Washington Heights", New York Magazine, July 1970
William H. Gerdts, "From Ashcan to Abstract: The Paintings of Elias Goldberg", Elias Goldberg Exhibition Catalogue, Janos Gat Gallery, 1999
Elaine de Kooning, "New York Without Tears: The Paintings of Elias Goldberg", Egan Gallery, 1948

References

Additional references
Bruce Hooton 1965 Interview of Elias Goldberg at the Smithsonian Archives of American Art
 9 works of Elias Goldberg, Joseph H. Hirshhorn Bequest at the Hirshhorn Museum and Sculpture Garden
AskArt Entry for Elias Goldberg

External links
Janos Gat Gallery

20th-century American painters
American male painters
Art Students League of New York alumni
1886 births
1978 deaths
20th-century American male artists